The Stewardesses is a 1969 American 3D softcore comedy film written and directed by Allan Silliphant (credited onscreen as Alf Silliman Jr.) and starring Christina Hart, Monica Gayle, Paula Erickson and Donna Stanley.

Produced on a budget of just over $100,000, the film grossed $26 million over its theatrical run, becoming the highest-grossing 3D film in history until the release of Avatar in 2009. In budget-relative terms it remains the most profitable 3D film ever released. Originally self-rated "X", in 1971 the film was re-edited with newly shot scenes to receive an "R" rating from the Motion Picture Association of America to qualify for a wide general release.

Plot 
A single eventful night in the lives of a crew of Los Angeles-based, trans-Pacific stewardesses. The leading character is killed in a 30-story suicide leap, and the others simply "party," using drugs and engaging in various sexual encounters. One of the girls befriends and beds a returning Vietnam combat soldier.

Production and development 
The film was initially a 35mm 3D softcore "skin-flick" with minimal production values and a very basic plot. Since it was grossing extremely well in specialty "adult theaters," in 1971 Silliphant and executive producer Louis Sher decided to repackage their film into a regular R-rated, general release 3D feature film, with a more complex, conventional storyline with reduced nudity and simulated sex activity. New scenes were shot in both Los Angeles and Hawaii to "open up" the picture, including dialogue and characters on a newer passenger plane interior and cockpit.

The self-imposed X rating was a draw in the early stages, attracting viewers to relatively small theaters showing the 3D film. In the last year, with the official R rating, it was possible to show the film more widely, even in 70mm 3D, in houses like the 4,300-seat Boston Music Hall. The film ran for three years and was presented in just over 800 theaters. It outsold some higher budget movies in larger theaters. The film also played in at least 30 overseas markets.

The film is also notable in that it may be the only film to be extensively re-shot, edited and updated as it played in theaters, according to Silliphant. Probably four versions of the evolving film were played over the three years that the film was in active distribution.

Writer, producer, director, and 3D technologist Allan Silliphant was the younger half-brother of Academy Award-winning writer and producer Stirling Silliphant. Co-producer and cinematographer Chris Condon, who had founded Century Precision Optics, built innovative, relatively lightweight and portable single-strip 3D cameras. Theater owner Louis Sher was the executive producer, and used his Art Theater Guild theaters to display the film coast to coast. Specially trained 3D technicians would be sent to each and every theater to install the special equipment, and to teach the projectionists how to keep it running.

3D stereo technology 
The film was shot in 35 mm color and projected in a new, single-strip, side-by-side polarized format called StereoVision. The image was compressed horizontally in printing, then expanded with an integrated anamorphic "unsqueezing" lens for projection. Unlike some prior technologies it was impossible for the two film images to go out of sync, because they were side by side on the same strip of film. All showings used sturdier plastic-framed polarized glasses, rather than the familiar paper ones of the 1950s. Silliphant was the original president of StereoVision International Inc., and was the co-inventor of the basic process.

In 1972, the film was blown up to side-by-side 70 mm 3D, which removed the requirement for anamorphics due to the wider frame.

Marketing history 
The film was uniquely marketed in that it never used a promotional trailer, but with many billboards, radio spots, and always an impressive "road show" treatment on the marquee of the theater. In several cases, the film ran for over a year in the same theater. The ad campaign would state "47th great week," or whatever was the local "hold-over" figure. It was the number-one film in the United States for three weeks in September and October 1971.

By 1976 it had earned a theatrical rentals in the United States and Canada of $6,878,450. In 2010-adjusted dollars, the domestic film rentals exceeded $141 million. Having grossed around 260 times its budget, it is, in relative terms, one of the all-time film financial successes.

Home video 

In the early days of video, Caballero Control Corporation released a re-edited version of The Stewardesses on VHS and Betamax tape formats, which are now out of print. In creating this XXX version, Caballero edited hardcore insert shots into the film and re-released it, with the tagline "From 3D to 3XXX" on the tape cover. Although being a non-official XXX version of the film, the original theatrical release credits for The Stewardesses remained intact for this release.

In 2009, the 3D and 2D versions of The Stewardesses became available on DVD. Marking 40 years since its theatrical release, the 2-DVD set also includes 2 pairs of 3D glasses and bonus features.

In 2016, the film was released by Kino Lorber on Blu-ray.

See also 
Come Fly with Me, 1963 film
Boeing Boeing, 1965 film version of the 1962 play
Coffee, Tea or Me?, 1967 novel
Fly Me, 1973 film
The Naughty Stewardesses, 1975 film, released in January
Blazing Stewardesses, 1975 film, released in June
List of 3D films

References 

The Stewardesses 3D SabuCat Productions is planning re-release of the film, and a documentary about it. Site includes history and interviews with actors and staff.
"Jet-setters in 3D", by Sarah Rowland, Montreal Mirror, July 15, 2004. Includes interview with cameraman.

The Numbers

External links 
 
 

1969 films
1960s 3D films
1960s sex comedy films
American sexploitation films
American sex comedy films
American aviation films
American 3D films
Films about flight attendants
1960s English-language films
1960s American films